1- Personal Memoir
 Date of Birth : 1/2/1941
 Married and has four children (two sons and two daughters)
2- Military Education
Received number of advanced AD courses
 AD battalion commander course from the Govorov Air Defense Academy in the Soviet Union 1969-1971
 AD Brigade commander course
 Staff course from command and staff college
 Fellowship degree from Nasser Academy (War college)
 High commander course from Nasser Academy
3- Main Posts
 Commander of AD Missile Battery and Battalion during Attrition War and 6th Oct. War.
 Commander of AD Missile Brigade
 Commander of AD Division
 Chief of AD Training Department
 Director Manager of AD College
 Chief of staff of AD Forces in June 1994
 Commander of AD Forces in April. 1996
4- Battle Field Experience
 June 1967 War
 October 1973 War
5- Decoration Awarded
 Medal of Excellent Service
 Merit of Long Service and Good Example
 Merit of Training
 Merit of Military Duty

References

1941 births
Living people
Egyptian generals